Stroud is a market town and civil parish in Gloucestershire, England. It is the main town in Stroud District. The town's population was 13,500 in 2021.

Below the western escarpment of the Cotswold Hills, at the meeting point of the Five Valleys, the town is noted for its steep streets. The Cotswold Area of Outstanding Natural Beauty surrounds the town, and the Cotswold Way path passes by it to the west. Not part of the town itself, the civil parishes of Rodborough and Cainscross form part of Stroud's urban area.

Stroud acts as a centre for surrounding villages and market towns including Amberley, Bisley, Bussage, Chalford, Dursley, Eastcombe, Eastington, King's Stanley, Leonard Stanley, Minchinhampton, Nailsworth, Oakridge, Painswick, Randwick, Selsley, Sheepscombe, Slad, Stonehouse, Brimscombe & Thrupp, Whiteshill and Woodchester.

In March 2021 The Sunday Times named Stroud the best place to live in the UK, citing the town's abundance of green spaces, independent spirit, and school quality.

Etymology
Stroud was named La Strode in a document of 1221, though most early records use the spelling Stroud.  The Old English name Strōd refers to a "marshy land overgrown with brushwood". Although the name is now pronounced to rhyme with "proud", its original pronunciation survives in the Kent town of Strood, which has the same etymology.

History

Stroud is known for its involvement in the Industrial Revolution. It was a cloth town: woollen mills were powered by the small rivers which flow through the five valleys, and supplied from Cotswold sheep which grazed on the hills above. Particularly noteworthy was the production of military uniforms in the colour Stroudwater Scarlet. Stroud became known for its production of broadcloth, which was widely known as "Stroud cloth" and traded around the world. The area became home to a sizable Huguenot community in the 17th century, fleeing persecution in Catholic France, followed by a significant Jewish presence in the 19th century, linked to the tailoring and cloth industries.

Stroud was an industrial and trading location in the 19th century, and so needed transport links. It first had a canal network in the form of the Stroudwater Navigation and the Thames & Severn Canal, both of which survived until the early 20th century. Restoration of these canals as a leisure facility by a partnership of Stroud District Council and the Cotswold Canals Trust is well under way with a multimillion-pound Lottery grant. Stroud railway station (on the Gloucester–Swindon Golden Valley Line) was designed by Isambard Kingdom Brunel.

Though there is much evidence of early historic settlement and transport, Stroud parish was originally part of Bisley, and only began to emerge as a distinct unit in the 13th century, taking its name from the marshy ground at the confluence of the Slad Brook and the River Frome called "La Strode", and was first recorded in 1221. The church was built by 1279, and it was assigned parochial rights by the rectors of Bisley in 1304, often cited as the date of Stroud's foundation.

Historic buildings and places of interest in the area include the neolithic long barrows at Uley, Selsley Common and Nympsfield to the west; Roman era remains at Frocester, West Hill near Uley, and Woodchester; the medieval buildings at Beverston Castle; and the outstanding Tudor houses at Newark Park and Owlpen Manor. Woodchester Mansion is a masterpiece of the Gothic Revival by local architect Benjamin Bucknall.

From 1837 to 1841, Stroud's MP was Lord John Russell of the Whig party, who later became prime minister. Russell was an important politician: he was responsible for passing Acts of Parliament such as the Public Health Act 1848, but he is mainly remembered as one of the chief architects of the Reform Act 1867. This Act, also known as the Second Reform Act, gave the vote to every urban male householder, not just those of considerable means. This increased the electorate by 1.5 million voters. Lord John Russell is remembered in the town in the names of two streets, John Street and Russell Street, as well as the Lord John public house. In 1835 the local press referred to Lord John Russell's opportunism in choosing Stroud as his new constituency as 'trying his hand in the vales of Gotham', a reference to a 1798 poem mocking Stroud residents for opening a church organ "before it could speak". "Gotham" was a popular local town nickname and "house" name at Eastcombe Manor school in the 1940s and 1950s.

Neolithic remains

Excavations in 1883 found a round barrow opening to the north-east, from which there was access to a simple square chamber of one cell containing disarticulated human remains. Traces of the chamber can still be seen, although it is not accessible. Additional burials were found adjacent to the barrow on the south-west side.

According to history books, the Iron Age tribesmen of Gloucestershire made their final stand against the massive Roman invasion on Minchinhampton Common. Survivors eventually fled to the north. Some earthworks, known as 'the Bulwarks,' and the Longstone of Minchinhampton are evidence of these ancient fortifications.

Roman remains 

Woodchester Roman Villa is one of many Roman villas discovered in Gloucestershire and was occupied between the early 2nd and late 4th centuries AD. There is now nothing visible of the villa above ground and the site is occupied by a later churchyard. The villa's most famous feature is the Orpheus mosaic, the second largest of its kind in Europe and one of the most intricate. It dates to c. AD 325 and was re-discovered by Gloucestershire-born antiquarian Samuel Lysons in 1793. It has been uncovered seven times since 1880, the last time in 1973, but there are no plans to reveal it again. It depicts Orpheus charming all forms of life with his lyre and has been praised for its accuracy and beauty.

In 1979, several portions of Roman tessellated pavement, Roman tiles, coins, pottery, etc. were discovered in the grounds of the house at Brown's Hill, one mile north of Stroud, suggesting the existence of a Roman villa.

Remains of a Roman villa have been found in the parish of Painswick, on a farm called Highfield, about half a mile north-west of the town. Walls were found, crossing one another at right angles; also many flue tiles, and some Roman coins. It was opened some years ago in a rough and hurried way, and covered up again. A short account of it appeared in the public press at the time.

The excavation at a site at Ebley Road in Stonehouse has revealed evidence of some of the earliest Roman activity known in the Stroud Valleys. A large rectangular enclosure dating back to the 1st century AD was found and more than a dozen human skeletons were unearthed at the end of 2010.

Demography
At the 2001 UK census, Stroud civil parish had a total population of 12,690.
For every 100 females, there were 96.4 males. Ethnically, the population is predominantly white (98.2%).
20.6% of the population were under the age of 16 and 8.3% were aged 75 and over; the mean age of the people of the urban area was 39.5. 92.6% of residents described their health as "fair" or better, similar to the average of 92.8% for the wider district.
The average household size was 2.4.
Of those aged 16–74, 24.5% had no academic qualifications,
lower than the national average of 28.9%. Of those aged 16–74, 2.6% were unemployed and 28.4% were economically inactive. At the 2011 census, 107,026 people were described as white British, plus 591 being from the Irish Republic. 2,752 were white other, 364 Caribbean, 129 African, 429 Asian and 300 other Asian, all from mixed multiple ethnic groups. Of these, India, Pakistan and Bangladesh accounted for 258 people. Chinese and Arab people accounted for 226 people.

There are two definitions for the town of Stroud. The narrowest definition is the parish, which had a population of 13,259 in 2011 and only includes the town centre and inner suburban areas. The urban subdivision had a population of 32,670 and includes many suburbs often considered part of the town. The urban area, which includes Stonehouse that has a largely separate identity, and other surrounding villages had a population of 60,155. Despite its extensive urban area, Stroud is surrounded by the greenbelt of the Cotswolds to the north, south and east.

Character and amenities
Stroud has a significant artistic community that dates back to the early 20th century. Jasper Conran called Stroud "the Covent Garden of the Cotswolds"; the Daily Telegraph has referred to it as "the artistic equivalent of bookish Hay-on-Wye"; while the London Evening Standard likened the town to "Notting Hill with wellies". The town has a large and diverse number of creative artists, musicians.

The town was one of the birthplaces of the organic food movement and was home to Britain's first fully organic café. The Biodynamic Agricultural Association is based in the town.

For many years Stroud has hosted a fringe festival on the second weekend in September. A new committee took over in early 2015 and now holds the festival on August Bank Holiday each year. The festival has been expanded to cover art and literature, as well as a diverse range of unsigned bands who are a contract with a record label. With a number of outdoor stages, and the majority of the venues in town taking part, over 400 performers can be seen free of charge over the course of the weekend. The town also hosts an annual series of lectures and exhibitions on contemporary textiles and textile culture called SELECT, run by Stroud International Textiles, an event that exhibits international textiles.

The Stroudwater Textile Trust was founded in 1999 to link the past and present of textiles in the Five Valleys and to manage the opening of several mills in which historic textile machinery, including a working waterwheel, has been restored and is demonstrated. The Trust has produced a DVD, Rivers of Cloth, using archive film and interviews which was due to be released in early 2011 and a photographic survey of surviving woollen mills was undertaken for a book, Wool and Water, published in 2012.

The Subscription Rooms at the centre of the town centre provide a venue for a variety of entertainment. There is also a small theatre, the Cotswold Playhouse, which is home to the amateur Cotswold Players; it occasionally hosts visiting professional companies.

On the fringes of the town are Stratford Park, originally the park of a small local weaver, now home to a leisure centre with an indoor and an outdoor swimming pool, and the Museum in the Park, a museum of the history and culture of the Stroud valleys.

The Redlers industrial estate is the site of the original Dudbridge Mills, beside the River Frome. From the mid-18th century onwards it housed the three mills of Daniel Chance: one corn, one gig and a dyehouse with eight drying racks. It was acquired in 1794 by John Apperley, whose family used the site for wool- and cloth-making for the next 140 years. In 1801 an industrial accident killed a young worker.

Campaigns
Stroud citizens have a history of protest going back to the Stroudwater Riots of 1825. In the late 1970s Stroud Campaign Against The Ringroad prevented Gloucestershire County Council's attempt to introduce new traffic plans. A few years later Stroud District Council tried to demolish 18th-century buildings in the town centre. Stroud High Street Action Group, with some rooftop protests and a high court judgement, demonstrated against this. The restored buildings are now a feature of the High Street. After a short occupation a compromise was reached in the demolition of buildings in Cornhill with many being saved, including one identified as a medieval house. This campaign led to the formation of the Stroud Preservation Trust. which has been instrumental in saving many of the town's oldest buildings such as Withey's house, the Brunel Goods Shed and the Hill Paul building.

In 1989 Stroud District Council tried to fell at midnight thirteen trees in Stratford Park near the road, which attracted national and international attention. Local Save The Trees campaigners had got in position first and prevented the felling, which was intended to allow road-widening. Campaigners occupied the trees for the next six weeks while, with the help of Friends of the Earth, introducing the County Surveyor to 'traffic calming' which he agreed to adopt instead of changing the road alignment. During the next five years County Surveyors' figures showed a fifty per cent decrease in accidents along this part of Stratford Road. The trees still survive.

In 2000 Stroud District Council gave permission for the Victorian landmark Hill Paul building to be demolished. After thwarting demolition, local activists formed a company and sold enough shares at £500 each to take an option on the building, which they passed on to a local developer. The building has now been restored and converted into apartments (see photo on the right).  The full records of the Hill Paul building campaign are with the Gloucestershire Archivist at D9242/Accession 11679/3.

The Save Stroud Hospitals Taskforce has been campaigning since spring 2006 against a range of cuts to health services in and around Stroud, with thousands of people taking part in street demonstrations. Stroud Maternity Hospital was saved in September 2006.

The Uplands Post Office branch in Stroud was one of 26 in the county to shut as part of a nationwide programme to cut losses.
Following local opposition, the Post Office agreed to talks with civic chiefs to look at how it could reopen. The town council agreed to provide £10,000 of funding for the service in 2008 and up to £25,000 for 2009. In November 2008 it was confirmed that Stroud has become only the second place in Britain to save one of its Post Offices.

In September 2010 the BNP scrapped plans to move their national media centre to Stroud after protests by local residents.

In February 2012 NHS managers agreed to halt plans for Stroud General Hospital to be run by a social enterprise after local residents mounted a legal challenge in the High Court.

Business
There is still a small textile industry (the green baize cloth used to cover snooker tables and the cloth covering championship tennis balls is made here), but today the town functions primarily as a centre for light engineering and small-scale manufacturing, and a provider of services for the surrounding villages. Stroud is a Fairtrade Town.

The Stroud and Swindon Building Society had its headquarters here until it merged with the Coventry Building Society on 1 September 2010. The building is now the headquarters of the renewable energy provider Ecotricity.

Damien Hirst owns the 'Science' facility in Stroud which produces his art.

In September 2009, the Stroud Pound Co-operative launched the Stroud Pound as an attempt to reinforce the local economy and encourage more local production. The currency's design follows that of the Chiemgauer, in being backed on a one-for-one basis by the national currency, having a charge for redemption which is donated to local charities, and including a system of demurrage to encourage rapid circulation.

Farmers' market

A farmers' market, launched by Jasper Conran and Isabella Blow on 3 July 1999, takes place every Saturday at the Cornhill market. It was nominated for the national Farmers' Market of the Year in 2001 and won it in 2007 and 2013. It also won the Cotswold Life magazine award for the best farmers' market in Gloucestershire in 2003, 2004, 2005 and 2010. The market featured in an episode of BBC TV's The Hairy Bikers' Food Tour of Britain in September 2009,  and won the Best Food Market award at the BBC Food & Farming Awards 2010. It is certified by FARMA.

In addition to the farmers' market there is a smaller market held (Fri & Sat) in The Shambles, an area adjacent to the steep High Street. John Wesley preached from a butcher's block in The Shambles on 26 June 1742. The Old Town Hall is one of the oldest existing buildings in Stroud: originally referred to as the market house, it was built in 1596 and is still in occasional use today.

Education

History
"There was a school at Stroud in 1576 but the schoolmaster, who did not have a licence and failed to teach the catechism, was then dismissed..."

Primary schools
There are six primary schools in the town:
Uplands Community Primary School
Callowell Primary School
Gastrells Community Primary School
Rosary Catholic Primary School
Severn View Academy
Stroud Valley Community School

Schools in surrounding areas include
Rodborough Community Primary school
 St Matthew's School (Cainscross)
Cashes Green Primary school (Cainscross)
Foxmoor Primary School  (Cainscross)
Whiteshill Community Primary school
Randwick CE Primary school
Gastrells Community Primary school
Further schools include Amberley Parochial School, Nailsworth School and Woodchester School.

Secondary schools
There are three secondary schools in Stroud.

Archway School is a County Council maintained comprehensive school offering an 11-to-18 education for children in Stroud, Rodborough and Cainscross.

There are also two state-funded selective schools, Marling School and Stroud High School. These former grant-maintained and foundation schools became academies in 2011. Both schools can trace their history back to the founding of Marling School in 1889 and Stroud High School which was founded in 1904 as the Girls' Endowed School. They continued to be grammar schools long after the comprehensive school became the norm in secondary education, and their future was the subject of long-running controversy. The two schools previously shared a mixed sixth form, called the Downfield Sixth Form, which worked in a three-way consortium with Archway Sixth Form and South Gloucestershire and Stroud College.

Other secondary schools in the locality include Maidenhill School in Stonehouse, and Thomas Keble School in Eastcombe and the private Wycliffe College in Stonehouse

Tertiary education
Tertiary education in the town is provided by South Gloucestershire and Stroud College.

Transport
There are multiple bus routes around Stroud, and to nearby towns as well as Gloucester, many of which are operated by Stagecoach West.

The town is also served by Great Western Railway trains from Stroud railway station, with frequent services to
Gloucester, Cheltenham, Swindon, Reading and London Paddington. The railway link was established in 1845. Up to then, Stroud had its own time which was set by a sundial at the top of Gloucester Street. There was also an observatory across the road from the hospital where now is a car park. As Stroud time was roughly 9 minutes behind GMT and people kept missing the train, a railway clock was put up in 1858 at the bottom of High Street. It was later moved across King Street to the top of Gloucester Street. The clock fell into disrepair over the years. It was finally saved by Captain Michael Maltin, who restored the clock in 1984 and found a new home for it in the Stroud library. Stonehouse railway station is on the western edge of the town and in the wider urban area.

The A46 road links Stroud to Cheltenham in the north and Bath to the south, with the A419
connecting Stroud to Cirencester in one direction and the M5 motorway at Junction 13 in the other.

National Express coaches serve the town on routes 401 (Bristol – London Victoria)  and 445 (Hereford – London Victoria). Stroud also lies on the traffic-free section of Sustrans National Cycle Network Route 45.

Stroud was connected to the canal system when the Stroudwater Navigation opened in 1779. It then became part of a through canal route from Bristol to London when the Thames and Severn Canal added a route over the Cotswolds in 1789. The canal closed in 1954 but the Cotswold Canals Trust is leading a project to reopen the entire length of the trans-Cotswold route. A visitor centre and restored lock are located in the town.

Literature
Novelists Sue Limb, Jilly Cooper and Katie Fforde, children's authors Jamila Gavin, John Dougherty Cindy Jefferies and Clive Dale, poet Jenny Joseph, and The Guardians food critic Matthew Fort have followed in the footsteps of the Rev. W. Awdry, and W. H. Davies and made the Stroud area their home.

Two of its most famous sons are the authors Laurie Lee, whose most notable creation Cider with Rosie is set in the nearby Slad valley, and Booker Prize-winning author Alan Hollinghurst. Poets Dennis Gould, Jeff Cloves, Philip Rush, Ted Milton, Michael Horovitz, Frances Horovitz and Adam Horovitz have grown up, lived and/or live in the area.

Culture
Stroud is home to the Bardic Chair of Hawkwood, an annual competition held at Hawkwood College in May to select that year's Bard who then has the responsibility to promote the bardic arts in the Stroud area.

Sport
Stroud Rugby Club, founded in 1873, play in the Western Counties North league. Their home ground is Fromehall Park, near the town centre.

Stroud Cricket Club is over 150 years old and plays its home games at Farmhill. The club has three senior teams, with the first eleven playing its cricket in the South West Premier league.

Since 1982 Stroud Athletic Club has organised an annual half marathon which takes place in October. Nearly 2,500 runners, from all over the country, entered in 2007. Members of the club include the UK number one Olympic Marathon runner Dan Robinson.

Stroud Swimming Club was officially formed in 1978, but can trace its origins back to 1905 when it was known as Stroud Swimming and Water Polo Club. In 2006 and 2007 club members made up two-thirds of the County team that finished in silver and bronze places respectively in the National Open Water Championships.

Stroud Hockey Club was founded in 1928 and has produced some top-class hockey players including Simon Mason. The club has three men's teams, three women's teams and a boys Badgers and a girls Vixens team, and under 8s, 10s and 12s for rising club stars. The club's home ground is at Stratford Park Leisure Centre, with training on Tuesday evenings during the season.

Their home ground is in Nailsworth, around 3.5 miles away. A lot of supporters live and come from Stroud and it is owned by Dale Vince who also owns Ecotricity.

The Stroud and District Football League is a local football competition for clubs in the Stroud area. The league was established in 1902 and is affiliated to the Gloucestershire County FA. It has a total of six divisions with the highest, Division One, sitting at level 14 of the English football league system. It is a feeder to the Gloucestershire Northern Senior League (GNSL) along with The North Gloucestershire League and The Cheltenham League.

Politics and media

Siobhan Baillie is the current Member of Parliament (MP) for Stroud, having beaten the sitting Labour MP, David Drew, at the 2019 general election. Drew had previously represented the constituency from 1997 until 2010, when Conservative Neil Carmichael was elected, and from 2017 to 2019.

In March 2008, a community radio station, Stroud FM, was launched in the town, broadcasting 24 hours a day on 107.9FM. The station, staffed by volunteers and funded by donations, focussed on local news and music, as well as national and international music, but closed in February 2014 due to a lack of funds.  Both BBC Radio Gloucestershire and Heart West have dedicated FM and DAB transmitters serving the town.

There are now three local newspapers covering the town: the weekly Gloucester Citizen, now called Stroud Citizen to replace Stroud Life, published by Gloucestershire Media (part of the Northcliffe Group); the Stroud News & Journal, published by Newsquest Media (Southern) Limited, part of the American Gannett Company and Stroud Times a hyper-local independent publication that launched online in March 2021 and in print the following year.

Stroud Life launched in 2008 and closed in October 2017. Most of its distribution was free direct to homes, but a significant share (about one-third) was sold through the news trade.

The Stroud News and Journal was formed by a merger in 1959 of the Stroud Journal (which started in 1854 as a Liberal-supporting newspaper) and the Stroud News (which started in 1867 and generally supported Conservative and Unionist interests).

Stroud Times was launched as an online-only venture in 2021 by Ash Loveridge, Carl Hewlett and Matt Bigwood all of whom formerly worked at The Stroud News and Journal.

Recognition

In a March 2021 guide, The Sunday Times named Stroud the best place to live in the UK. The newspaper praised the town's green spaces and independent spirit, as well as the quality of Stroud's schools.

Notable people

Activists
Polly Higgins, barrister, author, and environmental lobbyist lived near Stroud for the last few years of her life.
Gail Bradbrook, co-founder of Extinction Rebellion lives in Stroud.

Actors
Arabella Holzbog, actress, born in Stroud
Geoffrey Hutchings, actor, lived in Stroud
Tim McInnerny, actor (Blackadder), attended Marling School
Tamzin Malleson, actress, grew up in Chalford, attending Archway School, and now lives near Minchinhampton with partner Keith Allen
William Moseley, actor, The Chronicles of Narnia
Colin Prockter, actor, Doctor Who, co-wrote Luna, lives in Stroud
Emma Samms, actress, lives in Stroud
Sophie Ward, actress, lived in France Lynch

Artists
Leo Baxendale, creator of Minnie the Minx, lived nearby
Lynn Chadwick, sculptor
Damien Hirst, artist, has a studio in Chalford and another in Stroud
Mary Morton, sculptor
Tim Noble, artist
Jack Russell, former Gloucestershire and England cricketer, now artist, attended Archway School
Alan Thornhill, sculptor
Josh Record, singer/songwriter
Paul Hervey-Brookes plantsman and garden designer

Authors
Rev. W. Awdry, creator of Thomas the Tank Engine, moved to the area and was the Reverend of the parish church of Rodborough until his death in 1997. He is fondly remembered in the area and was seen daily riding his bicycle up the steep Rodborough hill.
Jilly Cooper, author, moved to the area
Katie Fforde, author, moved to the area
Matthew Fort, food writer, critic, and Guardian food columnist
Jamila Gavin, children's author, moved to Stroud
Adrian Liddell Hart, author and adventurer
Basil Liddell Hart, military theorist
Alan Hollinghurst, author, born in Stroud
Adam Horovitz, poet
Frances Horovitz, poet and broadcaster, lived near Stroud, 1971–80
Michael Horovitz, political poet and publisher, used to live in the area
Jenny Joseph, poet, writer of "I Shall Wear Purple", lived in nearby Minchinhampton
Laurie Lee, author, born in Stroud and grew up in the Slad Valley, the setting of Cider with Rosie

Engineering and manufacturing
Edwin Beard Budding (1795–1846), inventor of the lawnmower and adjustable spanner, born and died in Stroud
Arnold Redler (1875–1958), founder of the conveying company Redler Limited in Stroud in 1920 and inventor of the en-masse conveyor

Historians
Peter Hennessy, historian of government, attended Marling School

Musicians
Milk Teeth, grunge rock band formed at South Gloucestershire and Stroud College
Emily Barker, singer, songwriter, lives in Stroud
Geoffrey Burgon, composer
Eamon Hamilton, frontman of Brakes and former keyboard player of British Sea Power, raised in Stroud
Pendragon, progressive rock band
Gerry Rafferty died in Stroud in January 2011, at the home of his daughter Martha
Sade, singer, songwriter of the band Sade, moved to Slad, near Stroud in 2010
Tom Smith, lead singer of Editors, grew up in Stroud
Martha Tilston, folk singer and daughter of Steve Tilston, moved to the area
Sarana VerLin, Detroit singer-songwriter, violinist, and organizer of Stroud Americana Festival, moved to Stroud

Scientists

John Canton (1718–1772), physicist
Sir Martin Evans, Nobel Prize in Physiology or Medicine, born in Stroud
Henry Miles (1698–1763), dissenting minister and writer on science, born and educated in Stroud

Sportsmen and women
Dominic Dale, snooker player
Eddie "The Eagle" Edwards, ski jumper, lives in nearby Woodchester
Alastair Hignell, sportsman and commentator
Frank Keating, sports journalist at The Guardian
Stuart Nelson, footballer, Notts County
Emily Pidgeon, athlete
Dan Robinson, Olympic marathon runner
Laurence Shahlaei, winner of Britain's Strongest Man

Others
Sidney Cooke, child molester and serial killer, was born in Stroud.

Twin towns
 Saint-Ismier, Isère, France
 Stroud, Oklahoma, USA
 Duderstadt, Lower Saxony, Germany
 Stroud, New South Wales, Australia

Songs about Stroud
"Stroud, The Town of Make Believe", on the album Kenny Rogers' Greatest Hit, by post-punk band Blurt, founded in Stroud in 1979.

References

External links

Stroud Town Council
Stroud District Council
Stroud Times

 
Towns in Gloucestershire
Civil parishes in Gloucestershire
Cotswolds
Stroud District